Józef Rajnisz (born 3 March 1932) is a Polish gymnast. He competed in eight events at the 1960 Summer Olympics.

References

1932 births
Living people
Polish male artistic gymnasts
Olympic gymnasts of Poland
Gymnasts at the 1960 Summer Olympics
Sportspeople from Bytom